Richard de la More was a medieval clergyman who was Bishop-elect of Winchester from 1280 to 1282.

Life

Richard was subdean of the diocese of Lincoln as well as Archdeacon of Winchester from before 11 September 1280.

Richard was elected to the see of Winchester on 15 November 1280 but resigned in June 1282 before being consecrated. Archbishop John Peckham of Canterbury withheld his confirmation of the election because Richard was a pluralist. Pope Martin IV also quashed the election in 1282.

Richard still held the office of archdeacon until sometime after 19 June 1283, but was only listed as subdean of Lincoln on 3 May 1285. He died sometime after that date. His death was commemorated on 16 June.

Citations

References
 British History Online Archdeacons of Winchester accessed on 2 November 2007
 British History Online Bishops of Winchester accessed on 2 November 2007
 

Bishops of Winchester
Archdeacons of Winchester (ancient)
13th-century English Roman Catholic bishops